The Dane Ripper Stakes is a Brisbane Racing Club Group 2 Thoroughbred horse race held, under quality handicap conditions, for fillies and mares, over a distance of 1300 metres held at Eagle Farm Racecourse in Brisbane during the Queensland Winter Racing Carnival.  Prizemoney is A$200,000.

Due to track reconstruction of Eagle Farm Racecourse for the 2014–15 racing season the event was transferred to Doomben Racecourse and run over a slightly shorter distance.

History
The race was inaugurated as a supporting race (Race 7) on the Stradbroke Handicap racecard on 6 June 1992. Recently the race has been scheduled on Queensland Oaks day. but was moved in 2013 to Stradbroke Handicap day. The race was upgraded to a Listed race in 2003.

Winners of the Dane Ripper Stakes–Winter Stakes double are Blushing Bijou (1992) and Tripping (1996).

Name

1992–1994 - Crown Lager Fillies and Mares Quality Handicap
 1995 - Icegold Handicap
1996–1999 - Global TV Fillies and Mares Quality Handicap
2000–2001 - Dane Ripper Handicap
 2002 - Triple M's Blood, Sweat 'n' Beers Handicap
2003–2004 - Dane Ripper Handicap
2005–2006 - Dane Ripper Quality
2007 onwards - Dane Ripper Stakes

Grade

2003–2005 - Listed Race
2006–2009 -  Group 3
2010 onwards - Group 2

Distance

1992–1993 – 1200 metres
1994–2005 – 1300 metres
2006–2014 – 1400 metres
2015 – 1350 metres
2016–2020 – 1400 metres
2020 – 1300 metres

Venue
 2017 - Doomben Racecourse
 2015 - Doomben Racecourse

Winners

 2022 - Palaisipan
 2021 - Brooklyn Hustle
 2020 - Love You Lucy
 2019 - Invincibella
 2018 - Invincibella
 2017 - Prompt Response
 2016 - Cradle Me
 2015 - Hazard
 2014 - Cosmic Endeavour
 2013 - Red Tracer
 2012 - Red Tracer
 2011 - Hurtle Myrtle
 2010 - Set For Fame
 2009 - Chinchilla Rose
 2008 - Vietnam
 2007 - Rosa’s Spur
 2006 - Countess Bathory
 2005 - Our Sweet Moss
 2004 - Ta Ta Tatiana
 2003 - Recurring
 2002 - Princess Clang 
 2001 - China Amber 
 2000 - Annunciation 
 1999 - Grouse Lane 
 1998 - Dynamic Reason  
 1997 - Belle Salieri 
 1996 - Tripping 
 1995 - Jazz Heaven 
 1994 - Seawinne 
 1993 - Vanity Queen 
 1992 - Blushing Bijou

See also
 List of Australian Group races
 Group races

References

Sport in Brisbane
Horse races in Australia